The women's 200 metre individual medley event at the 1988 Summer Olympics took place on 24 September at the Jamsil Indoor Swimming Pool in Seoul, South Korea.

Records
Prior to this competition, the existing world and Olympic records were as follows.

The following records were established during the competition:

Results

Heats
Rule: The eight fastest swimmers advance to final A (Q), while the next eight to final B (q).

Finals

Final B

Final A

References

External links
 Official Report
 USA Swimming

Women's individual medley 200 metre
Olympic
Women's events at the 1988 Summer Olympics